DeGeneres is a surname of French origin. Notable people with the surname include:

 Betty DeGeneres (born 1930), mother of Ellen DeGeneres and American activist.
 Ellen DeGeneres (born 1958), American stand-up comedian, television hostess, and actress.
 Vance DeGeneres (born 1954), American actor, older brother of Ellen DeGeneres.
 Portia de Rossi, or Portia DeGeneres (born 1973), wife of Ellen DeGeneres and American actress.